New Urban Entertainment Television (NUE-TV) was an American cable network targeted toward African-American audiences. It was a direct competitor to Black Entertainment Television (BET), but was aiming for a more mature audience with more news. It operated between July 17, 2000 and October 31, 2002 and reached close to 3 million subscribers. In 2003, it was permanently shut down due to financial difficulties.  A big investor was Radio One and many employees came from BET.

See also
 Black Entertainment Television
 Urban One
 Black Family Channel (formerly MBC)

References

Defunct television networks in the United States
Television channels and stations established in 2000